James Andreas Demetriou (born 14 August 1995) is an Australian-born Cypriot professional footballer who plays as a forward for Sydney Olympic.

Club career

Nottingham Forest 
On 14 August 2013, Demetriou was given a two-year professional contract at the City Ground.

Later that season, he would receive his first international cap for Cyprus U21 in the U21 European Qualifiers.

After continuing with a run of goals in the U21 league, Demetriou was offered an extension on his contract amidst other English clubs wanting his signature.

Swansea City 
On 28 June 2014, Demetriou joined Swansea City FC on another two-year professional contract. There, he was charged with multiple purported betting offences and was fined £700 by the Football Association.

In 2015, Demetriou helped the reserves to the U21 Premier League Title.

On 14 March 2016 Demetriou joined Conference South side Wealdstone FC on an end-of-season loan to aid the side to safety.

Karmiotissa 
In September 2016, Demetriou completed a transfer to Cypriot First Division side Karmiotissa. He appeared on the bench three times for the club before making his debut in the Cypriot Cup against AEK Larnaca on 18 January 2017; he played forty-four minutes in a 1–6 defeat.

Welsh Premier League
On 6 October 2017, Demetriou joined Welsh Premier League side Bangor City. He made his debut the following day as a substitute, scoring the only goal of the game in a 1–0 victory over Bala Town.

On 30 January 2018, Demetriou joined fellow Welsh Premier League side Barry Town United and scored a hat-trick vs Llandudno after coming on for an injured teammate in the first half.

In June 2018 he returned to Sydney Olympic.

Personal life

Demetriou is eligible to play for Cyprus, with both of his grandparents having been born there.

Career statistics
.

References

External links

1995 births
Living people
Soccer players from Sydney
Cypriot footballers
Cyprus under-21 international footballers
Australian people of Greek Cypriot descent
Australian expatriate sportspeople in England
Association football forwards
Sydney Olympic FC players
Bangor City F.C. players
National Premier Leagues players
National League (English football) players
Cymru Premier players
Wealdstone F.C. players
Swansea City A.F.C. players
Karmiotissa FC players
Nottingham Forest F.C. players
Barry Town United F.C. players